Livingston County is a county located in the northwestern portion of the U.S. state of Missouri. As of the 2020 census, the population was 14,557. Its county seat is Chillicothe. The county was organized January 6, 1837, and named for U.S. Secretary of State Edward Livingston.

Geography

Adjacent counties
Grundy County (north)
Linn County (east)
Chariton County (southeast)
Carroll County (south)
Caldwell County (southwest)
Daviess County (northwest)

Major highways
 U.S. Route 36
 U.S. Route 65
 Route 190

Demographics

As of the 2010 census, there were 15,195 people, 5,871 households and 3,834 families residing in the county. The population density was 28 per square mile (12/km2). There were 6,730 housing units at an average density of 12 per square mile (5/km2). The racial makeup of the county was 95.39% White, 2.42% Black or African American, 0.32% Native American, 0.28% Asian, 0.02% Pacific Islander, 0.38% from other races, and 1.20% from two or more races. Approximately 1.19% of the population were Hispanic or Latino of any race.

There were 5,871 households, of which 29.59% had children under the age of 18 living with them, 51.29% were married couples living together, 10.00% had a female householder with no husband present, and 34.70% were non-families. 29.94% of all households were made up of individuals, and 14.43% had someone living alone who was 65 years of age or older.  The average household size was 2.36 and the average family size was 2.90.

Age distribution was 21.91% under the age of 18, 7.74% from 18 to 24, 25.34% from 25 to 44, 26.81% from 45 to 64, and 18.20% who were 65 years of age or older. The median age was 41 years. For every 100 females there were 81.02 males. For every 100 females age 18 and over, there were 76.47 males.

The median household income was $39,683, and the median family income was $53,325. Males had a median income of $38,282 versus $24,944 for females. The per capita income for the county was $20,295. About 15.8% of families and 20.6% of the population were below the poverty line, including 34.4% of those under age 18 and 18.4% of those age 65 or over.

2020 Census

Education

Public schools

Chillicothe R-II School District – Chillicothe
Garrison Elementary School (PK) 
Dewey Elementary School (K-01) 
Field Elementary School (02-03) 
Central Elementary School (04-05) 
Chillicothe Middle School (06-08) 
Chillicothe High School (09-12)
Livingston County R-III School District – Chula
Livingston County Elementary School (PK-08) 
Southwest Livingston County R-I School District – Ludlow
Southwest Livingston County Elementary School (PK-06) 
Southwest Livingston County High School (07-12)

Private schools
Bishop Hogan Memorial School – Chillicothe (K-09) – Roman Catholic

Public libraries
Livingston County Library

Politics

Local
The Republican Party predominantly controls politics at the local level in Livingston County. Republicans hold a majority of the elected positions in the county.

State

All of Livingston County is a part of Missouri's 7th District in the Missouri House of Representatives and is currently represented by Rusty Black (R-Chillicothe).

All of Livingston County is a part of Missouri's 21st District in the Missouri Senate and is currently represented by Denny Hoskins (R-Warrensburg).

Federal
All of Livingston County is included in Missouri's 6th Congressional District and is currently represented by Sam Graves (R-Tarkio) in the U.S. House of Representatives. Graves was elected to an eleventh term in 2020 over Democratic challenger Gena Ross.

Livingston County, along with the rest of the state of Missouri, is represented in the U.S. Senate by Josh Hawley (R-Columbia) and Roy Blunt (R-Strafford).

Blunt was elected to a second term in 2016 over then-Missouri Secretary of State Jason Kander.

Political Culture

At the presidential level, Livingston County has become solidly Republican in recent years. Bill Clinton was the last Democratic presidential nominee to carry Livingston County in 1996 with a plurality of the vote, and a Democrat hasn't won majority support from the county's voters in a presidential election since Jimmy Carter in 1976.

Like most rural areas throughout northern Missouri, voters in Livingston County generally adhere to socially and culturally conservative principles which tend to influence their Republican leanings, at least on the state and national levels. Despite support for socially conservative platforms, voters in the county have a penchant for advancing populist causes. In 2018, Missourians voted on a proposition (Proposition A) concerning right to work, the outcome of which ultimately reversed the right to work legislation passed in the state the previous year. 67.72% of Livingston County voters cast their ballots to overturn the law.

Missouri presidential preference primaries

2020
The 2020 presidential primaries for both the Democratic and Republican parties were held in Missouri on March 10. On the Democratic side, former Vice President Joe Biden (D-Delaware) both won statewide and carried Livingston County by a wide margin. Biden went on to defeat Trump in the general election.

Incumbent President Donald Trump (R-Florida) faced a primary challenge from former Massachusetts Governor Bill Weld, but won both Livingston County and statewide by large margins.

2016
The 2016 presidential primaries for both the Republican and Democratic parties were held in Missouri on March 15. Businessman Donald Trump (R-New York) narrowly won the state overall and won a plurality of the vote in Livingston County. He went on to win the presidency.

On the Democratic side, former Secretary of State Hillary Clinton (D-New York) narrowly won statewide, but Senator Bernie Sanders (I-Vermont) carried Livingston County by a single vote.

2012
The 2012 Missouri Republican Presidential Primary's results were nonbinding on the state's national convention delegates. Voters in Livingston County supported former U.S. Senator Rick Santorum (R-Pennsylvania), who finished first in the state at large, but eventually lost the nomination to former Governor Mitt Romney (R-Massachusetts). Delegates to the congressional district and state conventions were chosen at a county caucus, which selected a delegation favoring former U.S. House Speaker Newt Gingrich. Incumbent President Barack Obama easily won the Missouri Democratic Primary and renomination. He defeated Romney in the general election.

2008
In 2008, the Missouri Republican Presidential Primary was closely contested, with Senator John McCain (R-Arizona) prevailing and eventually winning the nomination.

Then-Senator Hillary Clinton (D-New York) received more votes than any candidate from either party in Livingston County during the 2008 presidential primary. Despite initial reports that Clinton had won Missouri, Barack Obama (D-Illinois), also a Senator at the time, narrowly defeated her statewide and later became that year's Democratic nominee, going on to win the presidency.

Communities

Cities
Chillicothe (county seat)
Chula
Wheeling

Villages
Ludlow
Mooresville
Utica

Census-designated place
Dawn

Other unincorporated place

 Avalon
 Bedford
 Farmersville
 Norville
 Sampsel
 Springhill
 Sturges

Notable people
Bower Slack Broaddus, U.S. Federal Judge
Courtney W. Campbell, U.S. Representative from Florida (1953-1955)
Ray and Faye Copeland, serial killers
Claude B. Hutchison, botanist, professor, and Mayor of Berkeley, California (1955-1963)
Jerry Litton, U.S. Representative from Missouri (1973-1976)
Charles H. Mansur, U.S. Representative from Missouri (1887-1893)
Shirley Collie Nelson, country music artist/actress
Henry Moses Pollard, U.S. Representative from Missouri (1877-1879)
John Quinn, Missouri State Representative (2001-2009)
William Y. Slack, brigadier general and politician
Clarence Edwin Watkins, publisher
Mike Lair, Missouri State Representative (2009–Present) and former teacher

See also
Haun's Mill massacre
Mormon War (1838)
National Register of Historic Places listings in Livingston County, Missouri

References

External links
 Livingston County Library
 Digitized 1930 Plat Book of Livingston County  from University of Missouri Division of Special Collections, Archives, and Rare Books

 
1837 establishments in Missouri
Populated places established in 1837